Pacific Creek may refer to:

 Pacific Creek (Teton County, Wyoming)
 Pacific Creek (Sweetwater County, Wyoming)
 Pacific Creek (British Columbia)